Athens State University is a public upper-division university in Athens, Alabama. Its academics are housed in three colleges: Education, Arts and Sciences, and Business.

History
Athens State University is Alabama's oldest educational institution of higher learning. It began as the Athens Female Academy in 1822. The Methodist Church began oversight of the institution in 1842, changing the name to the Athens Female Institute. It became Athens Female College in 1889.

In 1931 the name was shortened to Athens College when it became coeducational.

On May 10, 1974, the board of trustees requested from the North Alabama Conference of the United Methodist Church that the college seek affiliation with the State of Alabama. At its annual meeting in June 1974, the conference gave the board this permission and authorized the transfer of the college to the State of Alabama.

In June 1975, the college was accepted by the Alabama State Board of Education subject to the appropriation of operating funds by the Alabama legislature. Later that year, the legislature appropriated funds for the operation of the college to serve the graduates of state junior, community, and technical colleges/institutions.

Later, in 1998, the college became Athens State University.

On May 11, 2012, a bill was passed by the Alabama legislature allowing the creation of an autonomous board of trustees for the university. This board took office in October 2012. Athens State University remains the only upper-division university in the State of Alabama.

Athens State College Historic District

The Athens State College Historic District was named to the National Register of Historic Places on February 14, 1985. It includes Founders Hall, which was built in 1842–44. Founders Hall is individually listed on the Alabama Register of Landmarks and Heritage.

Notable alumni
 Chris Guillebeau, personal development author
 Steve Mizerak, billiards, winner of the U.S. Open in the 1970s
 Gary Redus, Major League Baseball player
 Dale Strong, member of the U.S. House of Representatives
 Ha Soo Whang, social worker

See also
Athens College (disambiguation)
Tennessee Wesleyan College, once also known as Athens Female College

References

External links

National Register of Historic Places in Limestone County, Alabama
Queen Anne architecture in Alabama
Greek Revival architecture in Alabama
Public universities and colleges in Alabama
Education in Limestone County, Alabama
Two year upper class colleges
Educational institutions established in 1822
Female seminaries in the United States
Universities and colleges accredited by the Southern Association of Colleges and Schools
Buildings and structures in Limestone County, Alabama
Historic districts in Limestone County, Alabama
Historic districts on the National Register of Historic Places in Alabama
Historic American Buildings Survey in Alabama
1822 establishments in Alabama
History of women in Alabama